Salinillas de Buradón is a village in Labastida municipality, Araba/Álava, Basque Country, Spain.

It is noteworthy for its well-preserved medieval walls and historic town centre, and it position sheltered between hills overlooking the River Ebro.

References

Populated places in Álava